Ayr station may refer to:

Rail
 Ayr railway station, Queensland, Australia
 Ayr TMD, Ayr, Ayrshire, Scotland, UK; a rail depot
 Ayr railway station (est. 1886), Ayr, Ayrshire, Scotland, UK; current rail station
 Ayr railway station (1839–1857), Ayr, Ayrshire, Scotland, UK; former rail station
 Ayr railway station (1856–1886), Ayr, Ayrshire, Scotland, UK; a former rail station replaced by Ayr railway station
 Newton-on-Ayr railway station, Ayr, Ayrshire, Scotland, UK
 Heads of Ayr railway station, South Ayrshire, Ayrshire, Scotland, UK; a former rail station
 Heads of Ayr Holiday Camp railway station, South Ayrshire, Ayrshire, Scotland, UK; a former rail station

Other uses
 STV Ayr, Ayr, Queensland, Australia; a TV station

See also
 Ayr (disambiguation)